Open Mike was an Australian interview-based talk show hosted by sports journalist and writer Mike Sheahan. Each week during the Australian Football League (AFL) season, Sheahan interviewed a figure in the history of Australian football, discussing their involvement in the game, whether on-field or off-field, as well as their lives and contributions away from the game.

History
The series premiered on Fox Sports Australia in 2009, before moving to Fox Sports' dedicated AFL channel Fox Footy in 2012. The show regularly aired on Monday nights at 9.30pm until moving to Tuesday nights at 8.30pm in 2016.

Guests have included former champion players Kevin Bartlett, Leigh Matthews and Bob Skilton; coaching greats Kevin Sheedy, David Parkin and Malcolm Blight, and media personalities Tony Charlton, Eddie McGuire and Sam Newman. Former chief executive officer of the AFL Andrew Demetriou, former Sydney premiership coach Paul Roos, and Kevin Sheedy have also appeared twice in two separate episodes.

In October 2020, it was announced by Fox Footy that Sheahan would be retiring after an 11 year stint at the station, thus concluding Open Mike. In a fitting farewell, the 234th and final episode turned the tables on the long-time presenter, with the longtime presenters of fellow Fox Footy program AFL 360, journalists Gerard Whateley and Mark Robinson taking the hosting role and interviewing Sheahan. The episode aired on 20 October 2020.

List of episodes

Season One (2009–11)

Episode 1 - Tom Harley (2009)
Episode 2 - Chris Judd (2009)
Episode 3 - Matthew Richardson (2009)
Episode 4 - Brett Kirk (2009)
Episode 5 - Jim Stynes (2010)
Episode 6 - Paul Roos (2010)
Episode 7 - Robert DiPierdomenico (2010)
Episode 8 - Craig Kelly (2010)
Episode 9 - Jason Dunstall (2010)
Episode 10 - Leigh Matthews (2011)
Episode 11 - Andrew McLeod (2011)
Episode 12 - Robert Flower (2011)
Episode 13 - Greg Williams (2011)
Episode 14 - Alastair Lynch (2011)
Episode 15 - Kevin Bartlett (2011)

Season Two (2012)

Episode 1 - Jim Stynes Tribute Special
Episode 2 - Nathan Buckley
Episode 3 - Dermott Brereton
Episode 4 - Glenn Archer
Episode 5 - Andrew Demetriou
Episode 6 - Sam Newman
Episode 7 - Stephen Kernahan
Episode 8 - Mark Ricciuto
Episode 9 - Neil Balme
Episode 10 - Jason Akermanis
Episode 11 - Peter Moore
Episode 12 - Malcolm Blight
Episode 13 - Adam Goodes
Episode 14 - Chris Grant
Episode 15 - David Parkin
Episode 16 - Denis Pagan
Episode 17 - Tony Charlton
Episode 18 - Stephen Silvagni
Episode 19 - Kevin Sheedy
Episode 20 - Warren Tredrea
Episode 21 - Phil Carman
Episode 22 - Steven Baker
Episode 23 - Robert Walls
Episode 24 - Martin Pike
Episode 25 - Don Scott
Episode 26 - Tadhg Kennelly
Episode 27 - Peter Hudson (Feat. Kevin Neale)

Season Three (2013)

Episode 1 - Eddie McGuire
Episode 2 - Gary Ablett Jnr
Episode 3 - Doug Hawkins
Episode 4 - Matthew Scarlett
Episode 5 - Rex Hunt
Episode 6 - Barry Hall
Episode 7 - David Schwarz
Episode 8 - Royce Hart
Episode 9 - Peter Schwab
Episode 10 - Nicky Winmar & Gilbert McAdam
Episode 11 - Sam Kekovich
Episode 12 - Warwick Capper
Episode 13 - John Kennedy Sr.
Episode 14 - Paul Salmon
Episode 15 - Wayne Johnston
Episode 16 - Simon Beasley
Episode 17 - Corey McKernan
Episode 18 - Mark Maclure
Episode 19 - Peter Knights
Episode 20 - Tony Liberatore
Episode 21 - Graham Cornes
Episode 22 - Wayne Schwass
Episode 23 - David Rhys-Jones
Episode 24 - Doug Wade
Episode 25 - Gary Ayres
Episode 26 - Neil Roberts, Keith Greig & Adam Cooney (Brownlow Night Special)
Episode 27 - Andrew Demetriou

Season Four (2014)

Episode 1 - Bob Skilton
Episode 2 - Ricky Nixon (Part 1)
Episode 3 - Ricky Nixon (Part 2)
Episode 4 - Neil Kerley
Episode 5 - Michael Voss
Episode 6 - Brent Guerra
Episode 7 - Cameron Mooney
Episode 8 - Des Tuddenham
Episode 9 - Justin Koschitzke
Episode 10 - Mal Brown
Episode 11 - Terry Daniher
Episode 12 - Alan Stoneham
Episode 13 - Garry Wilson
Episode 14 - Jason McCartney
Episode 15 - John Barnes
Episode 16 - David Neitz
Episode 17 - Gary Pert
Episode 18 - Michael Turner
Episode 19 - Ricky McLean
Episode 20 - John Kennedy Jr.
Episode 21 - Stewart Loewe
Episode 22 - Alec Epis
Episode 23 - Damian Monkhorst
Episode 24 - Mal Michael
Episode 25 - Gavin Wanganeen
Episode 26 - Tony Shaw
Episode 27 - Paul Couch
Episode 28 - Rene Kink

Season Five (2015)

Episode 1 - Jonathan Brown
Episode 2 - Guy McKenna
Episode 3 - Graham Arthur
Episode 4 - Mark Thompson
Episode 5 - Leon Baker
Episode 6 - Todd Viney
Episode 7 - Gavin Brown
Episode 8 - John Elliott
Episode 9 - Simon Madden
Episode 10 - Mark Eustice
Episode 11 - Chris Mew
Episode 12 - Ted Whitten Special: "Mr. Football 20 Years On"
Episode 13 - Jordan Bannister
Episode 14 - Tony Modra
Episode 15 - Billy Brownless
Episode 16 - Dale Lewis
Episode 17 - Gerard Neesham
Episode 18 - Tim McGrath
Episode 19 - Alex Johnson
Episode 20 - Barry Breen
Episode 21 - Beau Vernon
Episode 22 - Brian Cook
Episode 23 - The Cornes Family: Graham, Chad and Kane Cornes
Episode 24 - Tony Jewell
Episode 25 - Anthony Stevens
Episode 26 - Chris Lewis
Episode 27 - Grand Final Special: Agony & Ecstasy (Featuring Ron McKeown, Matthew Primus, Leo Barry and Shane Ellen)

Season Six (2016)

Episode 1 - Matinee Idols Special (Featuring Barry Richardson, Peter Hudson and Sam Newman)
Episode 2 - Caroline Wilson
Episode 3 - St Kilda Special: '50 Years On' (Commemorating the 50th anniversary of St. Kilda's only premiership in 1966)
Episode 4 - Richie Vandenberg
Episode 5 - Simon Black
Episode 6 - Paul Vander Haar
Episode 7 - Denis Banks
Episode 8 - Russell Greene
Episode 9 - Michael Conlan
Episode 10 - Ken Sheldon
Episode 11 - Rod Grinter
Episode 12 - Aaron Hamill
Episode 13 - Glen Jakovich
Episode 14 - Jake King
Episode 15 - Terry Wallace
Episode 16 - Anthony and Saverio Rocca
Episode 17 - Barry Cable
Episode 18 - Mark "Jacko" Jackson
Episode 19 - Steven Febey
Episode 20 - John and Marc Murphy
Episode 21 - Liam Pickering
Episode 22 - Andrew Ireland
Episode 23 - Paul Roos
Episode 24 - Mike Pyke
Episode 25 - Matthew Lloyd
Episode 26 - Brownlow Medal Special - John Schultz and Kevin Murray
Episode 27 - Brian Lake
Episode 28 - Peter Gordon (Western Bulldogs President) - Grand Final Week Special

Season Seven (2017)

Episode 1 - Western Bulldogs 2016 Premiership - 'Against All Odds'
Episode 2 - Matthew Pavlich
Episode 3 - Greg and Erin Phillips
Episode 4 - Anthony Koutoufides
Episode 5 - Geoff Raines
Episode 6 - Peter Bedford
Episode 7 - Gary Buckenara
Episode 8 - Daniel Ward
Episode 9 - Peter Sumich
Episode 10 - John Rantall
Episode 11 - Nick Dal Santo
Episode 12 - Peter Bosustow
Episode 13 - Oliver and Rachael Florent (featuring Ryan O’Connor)
Episode 14 - Jeff Kennett
Episode 15 - Jim Jess
Episode 16 - Ross Glendinning
Episode 17 - Geoff Southby
Episode 18 - Corey Enright
Episode 19 - Ron Joseph
Episode 20 - John Platten
Episode 21 - Paul Connors
Episode 22 - Brendon Gale
Episode 23 - Dustin Fletcher
Episode 24 - Brian Taylor
Episode 25 - Kevin Sheedy Special: 'Sheeds: 50 Years in Footy'

Season Eight (2018)

Episode 1 - Tom Lonergan and Andrew Mackie
Episode 2 - Justin Leppitsch
Episode 3 - Robert Murphy
Episode 4 - Dale Weightman
Episode 5 - Mervyn Keane
Episode 6 - Justin Madden
Episode 7 - Nathan Brown
Episode 8 - Mike Fitzpatrick
Episode 9 - Shaun Smith
Episode 10 - Hannah Mouncey
Episode 11 - Craig Hutchison
Episode 12 - Mike Sheahan & Ben Brown
Episode 13 - Daniel Southern
Episode 14 - Nick Maxwell
Episode 15 - Barry Stoneham
Episode 16 - Mark Neeld
Episode 17 - Mark Brayshaw
Episode 18 - Ken Hunter
Episode 19 - Shaun Rehn
Episode 20 - Jeff “Joffa” Corfe - Grand Final Week Special
Notes

  — As part of Player Takeover week on Fox Footy, the episode was split into two parts consisting of Brown interviewing Sheahan in the first half of the episode and Sheahan interviewing Brown in the second half of the episode.

Season Nine (2019)

Episode 1 - Sandy Roberts
Episode 2 - Ray Chamberlain
Episode 3 - The Hayes Family: Will, Prue & David Hayes
Episode 4 - Brendon Goddard
Episode 5 - Steven Smith
Episode 6 - Rodney Eade
Episode 7 - Brad Ottens
Episode 8 - David Dench & Kelvin Moore
Episode 9 - David McKay
Episode 10 - Clay Smith
Episode 11 - Mark Allen
Episode 12 - Andrew Dunkley
Episode 13 - Ray Shaw
Episode 14 - Scott Cummings
Episode 15 - The John Coleman Story
Episode 16 - Ray McLean
Episode 17 - Steve Johnson
Episode 18 - Tom Boyd
Episode 19 - Dane Swan
Episode 20 - Brian Lake & Marty Pask - Grand Final Week Special

Season Ten (2020)

Episode 1 - Callan Ward
Episode 2 - Michael Green
Episode 3 - Dale Morris
Episode 4 - Jason Johnson
Episode 5 - Geoff Blethyn
Episode 6 - Michael Gayfer
Episode 7 - Ian Stewart
Episode 8 - Alex Woodward
Episode 9 - Luke Ball
Episode 10 - Jack Trengove
Episode 11 - Matt Rendell
Episode 12 - Trent Croad
Episode 13 - Michael Roach
Episode 14 - Port Adelaide Special: (Featuring Russell Ebert and Darren Cahill) (Commemorating the 150th anniversary of the Port Adelaide Football Club.)
Episode 15 - Mike Sheahan Farewell Special: (featuring Mark Robinson and Gerard Whateley as interviewers)

Awards and nominations

Book
Published by The Slattery Media Group in 2013, Open Mike: Conversations with Greats of the AFL Game is a selection of transcripts of Open Mike interviews from the first two seasons.

See also

 List of Australian television series
 List of longest-running Australian television series

References

Australian television talk shows
Fox Footy original programming
2009 Australian television series debuts
2010s Australian television series
2020s Australian television series
2020 Australian television series endings
Australian rules football television series
English-language television shows